Six ships of the Royal Navy have borne the name HMS Halifax, after the English town of Halifax, West Yorkshire and the city of Halifax, Nova Scotia.

 HMS Halifax (1756) was a 22-gun sloop launched in 1756 and captured by the French in the same year at Oswego
  was a 6-gun schooner built 1765, purchased in 1768 and wrecked in 1775
 HMS Halifax (1775) was a schooner purchased in 1775 and sold 1780. She may have been the previous Halifax, salvaged and returned to service.
  was an 18-gun sloop, originally , built 1777, renamed after the capture of Ranger on 11 May 1780; sold in 1781
 HMS Halifax (1782) was a 10-gun schooner purchased in 1782 and sold in 1784
  was a 12-gun brig, the former French privateer Marie that the Royal Navy captured in 1797, commissioned in 1801, and sold that same year. She became the mercantile Halifax.
  was an 18-gun sloop launched in 1806 at Halifax, Nova Scotia and broken up in 1814

See also
 Ships of the Royal Canadian Navy named

References
 

Royal Navy ship names